Paul McGee (born 17 May 1968) is an Irish former professional football midfielder.

McGee scored twice as Emfa clinched the 1987 League of Ireland First Division Shield by virtue of a 4–2 win over Finn Harps at Oriel Park. It was the club's first season in senior football.

He was the PFAI Young Player of the Year for the 1987–88 season. Early in 1989, he moved to England when Jock Wallace signed him for Colchester United in the Fourth Division, but after just three games for the Essex side he made the big step up to the First Division when Bobby Gould signed him for FA Cup holders Wimbledon.

McGee scored the equaliser at Highbury on his debut for Wimbledon on his 21st birthday in May 1989, but had played only 60 league games for the Dons by the time he left them in 1995 to sign for Linfield in Northern Ireland. His best season at Wimbledon was the 1990–91 season, when he was Wimbledon's second highest scorer in the league with six goals. Three years later, however, he was rarely selected for the first team.

In more recent years, McGee has played for the Republic of Ireland PFAI Over 40s team, and scored a goal in the International Social Soccer Veteran's Tournament in Dublin in May 2014, at the age of 46.

Honours

Club
Kilkenny City
 League of Ireland First Division Shield: 1987

Individual
 PFAI Young Player of the Year: 1989

References

Since 1888... The Searchable Premiership and Football League Player Database (subscription required)
Paul McGee, Post War English & Scottish Football League A - Z Player's Transfer Database

1968 births
Living people
Republic of Ireland association footballers
League of Ireland players
Association football midfielders
Premier League players
NIFL Premiership players
Kilkenny City A.F.C. players
Bohemian F.C. players
Colchester United F.C. players
Wimbledon F.C. players
Peterborough United F.C. players
English Football League players
Linfield F.C. players
St Patrick's Athletic F.C. players
Athlone Town A.F.C. players
Republic of Ireland under-21 international footballers
Republic of Ireland under-23 international footballers
Tolka Rovers F.C. players
Association footballers from County Dublin